Mardan is a 2014 Iraqi drama film directed by Batin Ghobadi. It was selected as the Iraqi entry for the Best Foreign Language Film at the 87th Academy Awards, but was not nominated.

Cast
 Helan Abdulla as Leila
 Mehdi Bayramlou as Shemal
 Feyyaz Duman as Morad
 Hossein Hasan as Mardan
 Beritan Yeldistan as Rozhan
 Ismail Zagros as Karzan

See also
 List of submissions to the 87th Academy Awards for Best Foreign Language Film
 List of Iraqi submissions for the Academy Award for Best Foreign Language Film

References

External links
 

2014 films
2014 drama films
Iraqi drama films
Kurdish-language films